Chattanooga was a pop trio consisting of the Mia, Ackie and Clara Kempff sisters from Halmstad in Sweden. Scoring chart successes during the early 1980s. they participated at Melodifestivalen 1982 with the song "Hallå hela pressen", it ended up 4th.

In 2004, the trio was temporarily united to rerecord "Hallå hela pressen" together with Nina & Kim.

Discography

Albums
Stoppa pressarna - 1982
Glimten i ögat - 1983

Singles
Hallå hela pressen/Himmel och helvete
På jakt/Bitterljuva tårar
Kan inte stanna, kan inte gå/Leka med pojkar
Ute på vift/Längtans ateljé
På fri fot (promosingle)
Låt oss få ha våra drömmar ifred/Skyddsängel (maxisingle)

References

Östersundsposten interview with Mia Kempff 4 March 2010 accessdate: 31 March 2011

Halmstad
Swedish pop music groups